Akhmetov or Ahmetov is a Turkic surname that is common along the Islamic post-Soviet regions of Bashkortostan, Kazakhstan, Chuvashia and Tatarstan. The name originates from Arabic as Ahmad, meaning as the "most praiseworthy". The surname in feminine is often written as Akhmetova.

Notable people with the surname include:

Daniyal Akhmetov, former Prime Minister of Kazakhstan
Ilzat Akhmetov, Russian footballer of Uyghur descent
Rinat Akhmetov, richest Ukrainian businessman
Rustam Akhmetov, high jumper of Tatar descent
Serik Akhmetov, former Prime Minister of Kazakhstan

See also
Akhmetovo
Ahmad

Bashkir-language surnames
Tatar-language surnames
Kazakh-language surnames
Patronymic surnames
Surnames from given names